In mathematics, the Hardy–Littlewood zeta-function conjectures, named after Godfrey Harold Hardy and John Edensor Littlewood, are two conjectures concerning the distances between zeros and the density of zeros of the Riemann zeta function.

Conjectures 

In 1914, Godfrey Harold Hardy proved that the Riemann zeta function  has infinitely many real zeros.

Let  be the total number of real zeros,  be the total number of zeros of odd order of the function , lying on the interval
.

Hardy and Littlewood claimed two conjectures.

1.

2.

Status 

References

Conjectures
Zeta and L-functions